The  Philadelphia Eagles season was the franchise's 67th season in the National Football League, and the first under head coach Andy Reid. The team finished 5–11 and last place in the NFC East. The Eagles hired Andy Reid away from the Green Bay Packers to be their new head coach prior to the start of the season. In the 1999 NFL Draft, the team drafted quarterback Donovan McNabb with the second overall pick. Prior to McNabb taking over the starting role, the Eagles were quarterbacked by future head coach Doug Pederson, who led the Eagles to the win in Super Bowl LII. This would be the last year they missed the playoffs until 2005.

Offseason

NFL draft 
The 1999 NFL Draft was held April 17–18, 1999. The league also held a supplemental draft after the regular draft and before the regular season.

The Eagles, with the same record of 3–13 in 1998 as the Cincinnati Bengals and the Indianapolis Colts, would normally have had a chance at the number 1 pick in the 1999 draft. But the new Cleveland Browns franchise were given the top pick by the NFL. The Eagles did win the 2nd pick in the Draft and selected University of Syracuse quarterback Donovan McNabb. The Eagles, Bengals, and Colts rotated in each round picking 2nd, 3rd, or 4th after the Browns.

The table shows the Eagles selections and what picks they had that were traded away and the team that ended up with that pick. It is possible the Eagles' pick ended up with this team via another team that the Eagles made a trade with.
Not shown are acquired picks that the Eagles traded away.

 A Compensation Pick is a pick awarded by the NFL to a team that loses a Free Agent the year before

Staff

Roster

Regular season 
The quality of Andy Reid's work with the Packers attracted considerable notice throughout the league, leading to his being hired as the head coach of the Eagles on January 11, 1999. At the time, many in the local media in Philadelphia criticized the hiring, citing the availability of other candidates who had past records of success as head coaches. The Eagles, under former coach Ray Rhodes, finished in a three-way tie for the NFL's worst record at 3–13 the season before he took over. They improved two games in 1999 to finish at 5–11 (including the team's first road victory in 19 games, a 20–16 win over the Bears at Chicago on October 17, which was the first time the Philadelphia franchise had won an away game over the Bears since 1933).

Donovan McNabb was drafted second overall by the Eagles in the 1999 NFL Draft. McNabb saw his first NFL regular season action in the second half against the Tampa Bay Buccaneers in a 19–5 home loss on September 19. He made his first career start at home against Washington on November 14, completing eight of 21 passes for 60 yards in a 35–28 win. He also had nine carries for 49 rushing yards and led the team to a pair of successful two-point conversions (1 rush and 1 pass). With the win, he became the first Eagles rookie quarterback to win his first NFL start since Mike Boryla (December 1, 1974, vs. Green Bay) and the first Eagle quarterback to win his first start since Ty Detmer (October 13, 1996, at NYG).

McNabb threw the first TD pass of his career (6 yards to tight end Chad Lewis) vs. Indianapolis in a 44–17 home loss on November 21. McNabb went on to start six of the Eagles' final seven contests (missing the December 19 home game against New England, a 24–9 victory, due to injury) as he became the first Philadelphia Eagles rookie to start in the quarterback position since Brad Goebel on October 13, 1991, and the first Eagles rookie draft pick to start since John Reaves in 1972.

Schedule

Note: Intra-division opponents are in bold text.

Standings

Game summaries

Week 1: vs. Arizona Cardinals 
Cardinals 25, Eagles 24 (0–1)

In the season opener, the Eagles blew a 24–6 halftime lead, suffering a heartbreaking 25–24 home loss that saw the Cardinals rally for 13 fourth quarter points. Chris Jackie kicked the game-winning 31-yard field goal as time expired. Eagles quarterback Doug Pederson went 12 for 26 and a meager 91 yards, throwing for 2 TDs and 2 INTs. Duce Staley rushed for 111 yards on 21 attempts, with 1 rushing and 1 receiving TD. Staley's 24 yard rushing TD in the 1st quarter was the Eagles first score of the year. On defense, Brian Dawkins, Al Harris, and James Darling each intercepted Cardinals' quarterback Jake Plummer. The Eagles led 21–0 in the first quarter before suffering the devastating loss.

Week 2: vs. Tampa Bay Buccaneers 
Buccaneers 19, Eagles 5 (0–2)

The second week of the season saw an ineffective Doug Pederson (12 for 19, 100 yards, one interception) benched at halftime, with rookie Donovan McNabb (4 for 11, 26 yards) making his NFL debut and not faring much better. The Buccaneers defense held the Eagles at bay, with a 13–5 lead at halftime and shutout in the second half. Tampa's attack was led by Warrick Dunn & Mike Alstott, who combined for 146 rushing yards. Alstott and Bert Emanuel caught TD passes from Trent Dilfer (7 for 14, 89 yds, 2 TD, 2 INT). McNabb's first NFL completion was for 7 yards to Kevin Turner for a first down. Troy Vincent and Brian Dawkins intercepted Dilfer. An ugly game with little offense from the Eagles and 9 sacks from the Buccaneers defense.

Week 3: at Buffalo Bills 
Bills 26, Eagles 0 (0–3)

The Eagles threw up another "dud" performance against the Bills, and at the end of the game had the distinction of scoring 3 offensive points over the past 10 quarter. Doug Pederson threw for another pedestrian 14-for-26 and 137 yards. Philly RBs accounted for a meager 22 total yards, while Buffalo ran for over 170 on the ground. Donovan McNabb replaced Pederson in the 4th quarter, down 26–0, and would go 6-for-11 for 34 yards. McNabb's 10 yards rushing led all Eagles rushers. Brian Dawkins intercepted a pass for the third straight game.

Week 5: vs. Dallas Cowboys

References

External links 
 1999 Philadelphia Eagles at Pro-Football-Reference.com

Philadelphia Eagles seasons
Philadelphia Eagles
Philadelphia Eagles